USS Pratt may refer to:

 , a destroyer escort
 , a destroyer

United States Navy ship names